Ryszard Jan Szurkowski (12 January 1946 – 1 February 2021) was a Polish road bicycle racer, widely regarded as a legend of the sport in Poland.

Career
He was a silver medalist in the team trial at the 1972 and 1976 Summer Olympics, and also won three gold medals at the World Cycling Amateur Championships, two in 1973 (including one in the individual road race) and one in 1975. He won the Peace Race four times, in 1970, 1971, 1973 and 1975. He also came first twice in Dookoła Mazowsza, in 1977 and 1978.

His son, Norbert, died in the September 11 attacks.

In 2018, Szurkowski crashed during a bike race in Germany, suffering serious injuries, including a crushed spinal cord that left him paralyzed. After five months of therapy, he regained some of the sensation in his toes.

He died on 1 February 2021, twenty days after his 75th birthday.

References

External links
 

1946 births
2021 deaths
People from Milicz County
Polish male cyclists
Cyclists at the 1972 Summer Olympics
Cyclists at the 1976 Summer Olympics
Olympic cyclists of Poland
Olympic silver medalists for Poland
Olympic medalists in cycling
Sportspeople from Lower Silesian Voivodeship
Medalists at the 1972 Summer Olympics
Medalists at the 1976 Summer Olympics
UCI Road World Champions (elite men)